The Sixth Government of the Republic of Croatia was the Croatian Government cabinet led by Prime Minister Zlatko Mateša. Its members took office on 7 November 1995 by decree of President Franjo Tuđman. The cabinet was confirmed by a parliamentary vote on 28 November 1995, with 77 out of 127 Members of Parliament voting in favor. It was formed by the ruling Croatian Democratic Union, and its term ended on 27 January 2000 after the 2000 Croatian parliamentary election, with the appointment of Ivica Račan as Prime Minister.  This was the first peacetime government of independent Croatia, as the Croatian War of Independence officially ended with the Erdut Agreement just days after the cabinet was appointed by the President.

Motions of confidence

List of ministers and portfolios
Some periods in the table start before the cabinet's inauguration, when the minister listed was appointed to the post in the preceding Cabinet of Nikica Valentić.  The subsequent Cabinet of Ivica Račan I, formed by a broad coalition of parties that defeated the Croatian Democratic Union in the 2000 parliamentary election, kept only a single official from this cabinet, the Government secretary Jagoda Premužić.

 Also Deputy Prime Minister during the dates indicated.

References

External links
Official website of the Croatian Government
Chronology of Croatian cabinets at Hidra.hr 

1995 establishments in Croatia
2000 disestablishments in Croatia
Cabinets disestablished in 2000
Cabinets established in 1995
Matesa